Kotpad is a town and a notified area committee in Koraput district in the Indian state of Odisha. Nearest railway station to Kotpad is Kotpad Road station which is a part of East Coast railway.

Kotpad is famous for Saree and Handloom products. Kotpad Handloom is a vegetable-dyed fabric woven by the tribal weavers of the Mirgan community of Kotpad village in Koraput.

Kotpad recently came to limelight because of director Biswanath Rath's award-winning movie Kotpad Weaving : The Story of a Race Against Time.

Demographics
 India census, Kotpad had a population of 14,914. Males constitute 50% of the population and females 50%. Kotpad has an average literacy rate of 59%, lower than the national average of 59.5%: male literacy is 68%, and female literacy is 50%. In Kotpad, 13% of the population is under 6 years of age.

Politics
Current MLA from Kotpad Assembly Constituency is Padmini Dian of BJD . The previous MLA from Kotpad Assembly Constituency is Chandrasekhar Majhi of INC, He is the brother of Basudev Majhi who won the seat in State elections in 2009 and also in 2004, 2000, 1995, 1985, 1980 (as candidate of INC(I)) and 1977.

Noteworthy
Kotpad is known for the history of Damanyanti Sagar near Shiv Temple, it was called Damayantinagar earlier.

The headquarters of the social media messaging platform Waterchat Corporation founded in 2020 by Badal Behera is in Kotpad. Behera is the CEO and controlling shareholder of Waterchat.

References

Cities and towns in Koraput district